Max Cullen (born 29 April 1940) is an Australian stage and screen actor. He has appeared in many Australian films and television series but is best known for his role in the film Spider and Rose and the television series The Flying Doctors, Secret Valley and Love My Way.

Early life
Cullen was born in Wellington, New South Wales in 1940, but when he was one year old his family moved to Lawson in the Blue Mountains.

His brother was the actor Cul Cullen (1934–1982).

Career
He began his career as a painter and sculptor after training at Sydney's National Art School in 1956 and later studied at the Julian Ashton Art School with Brett Whiteley in 1959. His works have been exhibited regularly in solo and in group exhibitions and he has worked as an illustrator, cartoonist and layout artist on several magazines and newspapers.

Cullen was also a regular arts reporter on the Sunday current affairs television program. He has also worked as a professional and motivational speaker.

Since 2007 Cullen has also been performing "Lawson", a one-man show based on the life of Australian poet Henry Lawson.

Cullen had a role in the 2009 film X-Men Origins: Wolverine alongside fellow Australian actors Hugh Jackman and Asher Keddie.  He played "Owl Eyes" in the 2013 adaptation of The Great Gatsby.

Personal life
He has been married three times and has two daughters, one from each of his first two marriages.

Formerly married to actress Colleen Fitzpatrick from 1973–1987, they have one daughter, actress Katharine Cullen born 9 June 1975 and one grandson William Richards born 17 August 2013.

Selected filmography

Nightwait (1966) - Milkbar customer
You Can't See 'round Corners (1969) - Peeper
Stockade (1971) - Rafaello Carboni
The Office Picnic (1972) - Paddy
The Hotline (1974, TV Movie)
Sunday Too Far Away (1975) - Tim King
Summerfield (1977) - Jim Tate
Blue Fin (1978) - Pensioner
The Odd Angry Shot (1979) - Warrant Officer (uncredited)
My Brilliant Career (1979) - Mr. McSwatt
Dimboola (1979) - Mutton
Hard Knocks (1980) - Newman
Hoodwink (1981) - Factory clerk
Starstruck (1982) - Reg
Running on Empty (1982) - Rebel
Midnite Spares (1983) - Tomas
With Prejudice (1983) - Krawczyk
The Return of Captain Invincible (1983) - Italian Man
Stanley: Every Home Should Have One (1984) - Berger
Charley's Web (1986, TV Movie) - Charley O'Keefe
Incident at Raven's Gate (1988) - Taylor
Boundaries of the Heart (1988) - Blanco White
Luigi's Ladies (1989) - Chef
Grim Pickings (1989, TV Mini-Series) - Inspector Toby
Call Me Mr. Brown (1990) - Fibreglass Factory Foreman
The Returning (1990) - Father Donohue
As Happy as Larry (1991) - Bert
Garbo (1992) - Wal
Mad Bomber in Love (1992) - Sergeant Meggs
Greenkeeping (1992) - Tom
Shotgun Wedding (1993) - Rev. Arthur Hickey
Lightning Jack (1994) - Bart
Spider and Rose (1994) - Jack
Rough Diamonds (1995) - Magistrate Roy
Billy's Holiday (1995) - Billy Apples
Kiss or Kill (1997) - Stan
In a Savage Land (1999) - Douglas Stevens
The Nugget (2002) - Wally
Jindabyne (2006) - Terry
December Boys (2007) - Narrator / Adult Misty
Australia (2008) - Old Drunk
X-Men Origins: Wolverine (2009) - Travis Hudson
Possession(s) (2009) - Paul
Anyone You Want (2010) - Glen
Santa's Apprentice (2010) - Humphrey (English version, voice)
The Great Gatsby (2013) - Owl Eyes
Broke (2016) - Cec
Goldstone (2016) - Old Timer
Never Too Late (2020) - Hank
The Skin of Others (2020) - Henry Lawson

Awards
 1984 Logie Award for Best Supporting Actor in The Last Bastion
 1986 Penguin Award for Best Performance by an Actor in The Flying Doctors
 1990 Sydney Theatre Critics Award for Best Supporting Actor in The Tempest
 1994 Film Critics Circle Award for Best Supporting Actor in Spider and Rose
 1994 AFI Award for Best Supporting Actor in Spider and Rose'
 2005 AFI Television Awards for Best Actor in a Supporting or Guest Role in a Television Drama or Comedy in Love My Way''

References

External links

1940 births
Australian male film actors
Australian male stage actors
Australian male television actors
Best Supporting Actor AACTA Award winners
Living people
Logie Award winners
Julian Ashton Art School alumni